Adygeya is a genus of cephalopods assigned to the Spirulida.

References

Coleoidea